The United Nations Educational, Scientific and Cultural Organization (UNESCO) World Heritage Sites are places of importance to cultural or natural heritage as described in the UNESCO World Heritage Convention, established in 1972. Cultural heritage consists of monuments (such as architectural works, monumental sculptures, or inscriptions), groups of buildings, and sites (including archaeological sites). Natural features (consisting of physical and biological formations), geological and physiographical formations (including habitats of threatened species of animals and plants), and natural sites which are important from the point of view of science, conservation or natural beauty, are defined as natural heritage. Spain ratified the convention on May 4, 1982, making its historical sites eligible for inclusion on the list.

Sites in Spain were first inscribed on the list at the 8th Session of the World Heritage Committee, held in Buenos Aires, Argentina in 1984. At that session, five sites were added: the Cathedral of Our Lady of the Assumption, Córdoba; The Alhambra and the Generalife, Granada; Burgos Cathedral; Monastery and Site of the Escorial, Madrid; and Park Güell, Palau Güell and Casa Milà, in Barcelona. Five sites were added in 1985, and another four in 1986. Apart from 1984, 1985, and 1986 (Spain's first three years as a member), 2000 saw the most new sites inscribed, with five that year. , Spain has 49 total sites inscribed on the list, the same number as France, which is the fourth largest number of sites per country, only behind Italy (58), China (56), and Germany (51). Of these 49 sites, 43 are cultural, 4 are natural, and 2 are mixed (meeting both cultural and natural criteria), as determined by the organization's selection criteria.

Two sites are located in the Balearic Islands and four are in the Canary Islands. Four sites are transnational. The Pirineos – Monte Perdido World Heritage Site is shared with France, while the Prehistoric Rock-Art Sites in the Côa Valley and Siega Verde site is shared with Portugal. Almadén is inscribed alongside Idrija in Slovenia. The Ancient and Primeval Beech Forests of the Carpathians and Other Regions of Europe are shared with 17 other European countries.

Additionally, Spain has established an agreement with UNESCO known as the Spanish Funds-in-Trust. The agreement was signed on April 18, 2002, between Francisco Villar, Spanish Ambassador and Permanent Delegate to UNESCO, and the Director-General of UNESCO, Kōichirō Matsuura. The fund provides € 600,000 annually to a chosen program. Programs include helping other member states, particularly in Latin America, with projects such as nominations processes and assessing tentative sites. Spain served as the chair of the World Heritage Committee in 2008 and 2009, and in 2009 hosted the 33rd Session of the Committee in Seville, Andalusia.



World Heritage Sites 
UNESCO lists sites under ten criteria; each entry must meet at least one of the criteria. Criteria i through vi are cultural, and vii through x are natural.

Sites by autonomous community
Exclusive sites refer to sites locating in a single community. Shared sites refer to sites with entries in multiple communities, including Pirineos – Monte Perdido, which Aragon shares with France, Prehistoric Rock-Art Sites in the Côa Valley and Siega Verde, which Castile and León shares with Portugal and Ancient and Primeval Beech Forests which Navarre, Castile and León, Community of Madrid and Castile-La Mancha shares with other countries of Europe.

Tentative list

In addition to sites inscribed on the World Heritage List, member states can maintain a list of tentative sites that they may consider for nomination. Nominations for the World Heritage List are only accepted if the site was previously listed on the tentative list. As of 2016, Spain recorded 32 sites on its tentative list. At 2018, the sites, along with the year they were included on the tentative list are:

 Romanesque Cultural Enclave in the North of Castile and León and the South of Cantabria (Palencia Province and Cantabria) (1998) 
 Bulwarked Frontier Fortifications (Aragon, Castile and León, Catalonia, Extremadura  and Navarre) (1998)
 The Silver Route (Castile and León and Extremadura) (1998)
 Mediterranean Wind Mills (Region of Murcia) (1998)
 Greek Archaeological ensemble in Empúries, l'Escala, Girona Province (2002)
 The Ribeira Sacra (Lugo and Ourense provinces) (1996)
 The Mediterranean Facet of the Pyrenees (Girona Province-France) (2004)
 Talayotic culture of Minorca (Minorca island) (2013)
 Mesta Livestock trails (includes Cañadas Reales) (Castile and León) (2007)
 Roman Ways. Itineraries of the Roman Empire (Andalusia, Castile-La Mancha, Catalonia and Valencian Community) (shared with other countries) (2007)
 Ancares – Somiedo (Galicia, Castile and León and Asturias) (2007)
 Loarre Castle (Aragon) (2007)
 Ferrol of the Illustration Historical Heritage (Galicia) (2007)
 Mining Historical Heritage (2007)
 Plasencia - Monfragüe - Trujillo: Mediterranean Landscape (Extremadura) (2009)
 Jaén Cathedral (extension of the Renaissance Monumental Ensembles of Úbeda and Baeza) (2012)
 Salty Valley of Añana (Basque Country) (2012)
 La Rioja and Rioja Alavesa Vine and Wine Cultural Landscape (La Rioja and Basque Country) (2013)
 Priorat - Montsant - Siurana. Agricultural Landscape of the Mediterranean Mountain (Catalonia) (2014)
 Site of the Retiro and the Prado in Madrid (2015) (admitted into the World Heritage List in 2021)
 The Portal of the Ripoll Monastery (Catalonia) (2015)
 Hill of the Seu Vella of Lleida (2016)
 Monastery of Santa María de La Rábida and the Columbus Memorial Places in Huelva (2016)
Church of San Salvador de Valdediós (Asturias) (2017)
 The Olive Grove Landscapes of Andalusia (2017)
 The Wine in Iberia (Region of Murcia, Andalusia and Valencian Community) (2018)
 Cíes Islands – Atlantic Islands of Galicia National Park (2018)
 The Hadrianic city of Italica (2019)
 Group of Mozarabic buildings on the Iberian Peninsula (2019)
 The Episcopal See of Egara and its pictorial decoration (5th-8th centuries) (2019)
 Les témoignages matériels de la construction de l’État des Pyrénées : la Co-principauté d’Andorre (Spain) (2021)
 Sigüenza and Atienza Sweet and Salty Landscape (2022)

References

External links
 Comisión Nacional Española de Cooperación con la UNESCO

 
Spain
World Heritage
Cultural tourism in Spain
World Heritage Sites